Mohammed Hasbullah bin Awang (born 3 April 1983 in Terengganu) is a Malaysian footballer who plays and captain for Terengganu II in Malaysia Premier League as a defender.

Career statistics

References

External links
 Hasbullah Awang Profile
 

1983 births
Living people
Malaysian footballers
Terengganu F.C. II players
People from Terengganu
Malaysian people of Malay descent
Association football defenders